The 2017–18 Iranian Futsal 1st Division will be divided into two phases.

The league is composed of 17 teams divided into two divisions of 9 teams and 8 teams, whose teams are divided geographically. Teams will play only other teams in their own division, once at home and once away for a total of 16 matches each.

Teams

Group A

Group B 

1 Shahed Shiraz Renamed to Ramak Shahed Shiraz
Note: Tarh va Toseh Sabz Alvand Qazvin and Ferdosi Mashhad Withdrew from the league before the start of competition.

Number of teams by region

League standings

Group A

Group B

Results table

Group A

Group B

Clubs season-progress

Play Off 

 Winner Promoted to the Super League.

First leg

Return leg

Final

See also 
 2017–18 Futsal Super League
 2018 Futsal's 2nd Division
 2017–18 Iran Pro League
 2017–18 Azadegan League
 2017–18 Iran Football's 2nd Division
 2017–18 Iran Football's 3rd Division
 2017–18 Hazfi Cup
 2017 Iranian Super Cup

References

External links 
   پایگاه خبری فوتسال ایران
  I.R. Iran Football Federation

Iran Futsal's 1st Division seasons
2017–18 in Iranian futsal leagues